"Santa Monica" is a single by Theory of a Deadman, featured on the Gasoline album. It was released as the second single in Canada in June 2005, and as the fourth single in the United States on August 18, 2006. The song was heavily featured in the video game Fahrenheit (also known as Indigo Prophecy).

Song meaning
The song is written from the point of view of a man who gets home from work and reads a note from his girlfriend telling him that she has left him and went to Santa Monica Boulevard, Los Angeles, California, to try and lead a better life. In the song, the man is looking back on the event and seems to be referring to it in the past tense: "I remember the day when you left for Santa Monica."  The video plays with the ambiguity between Santa Monica Boulevard and the city of Santa Monica, but it's pretty clear it's the street in Los Angeles that is intended.

The song has no relation to the 1995 Everclear song of the same name, however Tyler Connolly has stated during their live shows that it is one of the band's favorite songs.

Music video
In the music video, a girl is writing a note to give to her boyfriend before she leaves. When he gets home, she's gone and he's left with the note. He sometimes gets letters and post cards from her about her trip to Santa Monica, while he's home wishing she was with him. While in Santa Monica the girl has a tough time. She is eventually driven to stripping and prostitution. She finally gives up and the last shot in the video is her walking back into her ex-boyfriend's house after finally calling him and saying how miserable her life had become.

Track listing

Canadian single
 "Santa Monica"
 "Santa Monica" (acoustic version)
 "Got Me Wrong" (Alice in Chains cover)

U.S. single
 "Santa Monica"

Associates
The drums in the song "Santa Monica" were played by Nickelback's Daniel Adair.
String Arrangements in "Santa Monica" were by Suzie Katayama.

Chart positions

Certifications

References

2005 singles
Theory of a Deadman songs
Songs written by Tyler Connolly
Torch songs
604 Records singles